Kristijan Krajina (born December 28, 1990) is a Croatian professional basketball player for New Taipei CTBC DEA of the T1 League.

Early life 
A native of Osijek, Krajina moved to the United States as a high school senior and spent six years playing college basketball at the Mount St. Mary's University in Maryland.

Professional career 
After college, he returned to Croatia to play professional basketball. In August 2015, Krajina signed a one-year contract with Šibenik. After a successful season in Šibenik, he moved to Zadar in June 2016.

On August 19, 2019, he has signed with VEF Rīga of the LEBL.  In February 2020, Krajina signed with CSM U Oradea of the Romanian League.

On July 16, 2020, Krajina has signed with Cibona. In November, 2020, his contract with Cibona was terminated.

In February 2021, Krajina signed with Fribourg Olympic of the Swiss Basketball League.

On August 31, 2021, Krajina signed with Phoenix Brussels of the BNXT League. He averaged 10 points, 4.2 rebounds, and 1.5 assists per game. On December 7, 2021, Krajina signed with GTK Gliwice of the Polish Basketball League.

On September 22, 2022, Krajina signed with New Taipei CTBC DEA of the T1 League.

Personal life 
Krajina's younger brother Filip (born 1995) is also a professional basketball player.
Krajina has been in a relationship with American-Croatian tennis player Bernarda Pera since 2018.

References

External links
 ABA League Profile
 RealGM Profile

1990 births
Living people
ABA League players
BK VEF Rīga players
Brussels Basketball players
Centers (basketball)
Croatian expatriate basketball people in the United States
Croatian men's basketball players
CSM Oradea (basketball) players
Fribourg Olympic players
GKK Šibenik players
GTK Gliwice players
KK Cibona players
KK Zadar players
Mount St. Mary's Mountaineers men's basketball players
Sportspeople from Osijek
New Taipei CTBC DEA players
T1 League imports
T1 League All-Stars